Clay Township is a civil township of St. Clair County in the U.S. state of Michigan.  The population was 9,066 at the 2010 Census. 

The township is located along the mouth of the St. Clair River at Lake St. Clair, and the river delta includes Harsens Island and numerous other islands.  The township mostly surrounds the city of Algonac, but the two are administered autonomously since Algonac incorporated as a city in 1967.

Amenities and communities
Clay Township Park is located on Pte Tremble Road, next to the Clay Township offices and Police Department. It includes a children's playground and a water splash pad. Impromptu volleyball games take place, and residents enjoy the walking paths. The park features a basketball court that is flooded in winter to serve as an ice skating rink and walking trail. It is lighted to facilitate evening accessibility. A concession building and restroom facilities are also available.

Communities
Pearl Beach is an area within the township, defined as a census-designated place (CDP) for statistical purposes by the U.S. Census Bureau.
Pointe aux Tremble is an Unincorporated community within the Pearl Beach CDP.
Perch Point is an unincorporated community on the boundary with Ira Township.
Several unincorporated communities are located on Harsens Island:
Bedore is south along Bates Highway/S. Channel Drive between Forster and Clays Landing. (Elevation: 571 ft./174 m.)
Clays Landing is where M-154 turns in to S. Channel Drive. (Elevation: 574 ft./175 m.)
Forster is south along Bates Highway/S. Channel Drive. (Elevation: 577 ft./176 m.)
Grande Pointe is on the northeast end of the Island between N. Channel Drive and S. Channel Drive. (Elevation: 577 ft. /176 m.)  
Maple Leaf is on St. Clair River (east) shore between Volkes Road and Bar Harbor just south of Sans Souci. (Elevation: 577 ft. /176 m.)
Miller is at the end of Bates Highway where it becomes only S. Channel Drive. (Elevation:  577 ft./176 m.)  
Muirs is on M-154 south of Maple Leaf.
Sans Souci, is the town on Harsens Island, on the St. Clair River or South Channel (east) side of the Island.

Geography
The  township includes Harsens Island, Russell Island, Dickinson Island and St. Johns Marsh.

Demographics
As of the census of 2000, there were 9,822 people, 3,934 households, and 2,844 families residing in the township. The racial makeup of the township was 97.92% White, 0.20% African American, 0.68% Native American, 0.11% Asian, 0.21% from other races, and 0.87% from two or more races. Hispanic or Latino of any race were 0.85% of the population.

There were 3,934 households, out of which 27.9% had children under the age of 18 living with them, 61.3% were married couples living together, 7.0% had a female householder with no husband present, and 27.7% were non-families. 22.9% of all households were made up of individuals, and 9.2% had someone living alone who was 65 years of age or older.  The average household size was 2.50 and the average family size was 2.94.

In the township the population was spread out, with 22.6% under the age of 18, 6.5% from 18 to 24, 28.2% from 25 to 44, 28.8% from 45 to 64, and 13.9% who were 65 years of age or older.  The median age was 41 years. For every 100 females, there were 103.6 males.  For every 100 females age 18 and over, there were 103.2 males.

The median income for a household in the township was $55,059, and the median income for a family was $63,182. Males had a median income of $48,053 versus $31,923 for females. The per capita income for the township was $27,169.  About 2.3% of families and 4.7% of the population were below the poverty line, including 6.7% of those under age 18 and 3.6% of those age 65 or over.

References

External links
Clay Township Official Website

Townships in St. Clair County, Michigan
Townships in Michigan
Michigan populated places on Lake St. Clair